Kinnerton railway station was a station in Higher Kinnerton, Flintshire, Wales. The station was opened on 2 February 1891 and closed on 30 April 1962.

References

Further reading

Disused railway stations in Flintshire
Railway stations in Great Britain opened in 1891
Railway stations in Great Britain closed in 1962
Former London and North Western Railway stations